Recommended Records (RēR) is a British independent record label and distribution network founded by Chris Cutler with Nick Hobbs in March 1978. RēR features largely "Rock in Opposition" and related music, but it also distributes selected music released on other independent labels.

In 1982 Cutler established November Books, the publishing wing of Recommended Records, and between 1985 and 1997, Recommended Records and November Books published RēR Quarterly, a "quarterly" sound-magazine edited by Cutler.

In 1989 Recommended Records became known as RēR Megacorp with a turnover of £180,000 in 1994.

History
When English avant-rock group Henry Cow toured Europe between 1975 and 1977 they encountered many bands in a similar situation to their own: they were forced to operate outside the music industry that refused to recognise their music. In 1978 these groups got together and formed Rock in Opposition (RIO). To provide a record label and distribution network for these artists, Chris Cutler of Henry Cow and Nick Hobbs, Henry Cow's manager at the time, established Recommended Records (RēR) as a model for a non-profit music company. When RIO folded as an organisation in late 1979, RēR continued RIO's work by representing and promoting marginalised musicians and groups. RēR became a "virtual RIO", and "part of the continuing legacy of RIO".

Recommended Records grew from "Ré", a private record label in 1978 to "RēR Megacorp" in 1989, an internationally recognised independent record company with distributors worldwide. They have consistently introduced new and interesting artists from around the world, many of whom might never have been able to release records. They have always put the artist first and commercial viability second.

Evolution of the name
When Henry Cow split up in 1978, Chris Cutler created a record label called Ré for his own projects with a distribution arm called Recommended Distribution, so called because he personally "recommended" the titles they distributed. The intention was to import and distribute new, interesting and experimental music from all over the world to the United Kingdom.

In 1979, Cutler established the Recommended label for releases other than his own. In 1987, he combined the Ré and Recommended labels to form RēR, and at the same time Recommended Distribution became a worker's cooperative enabling Cutler to concentrate on running the RéR label and writing RēR's mail order catalogue. This arrangement worked for a few years, but in 1989, due to enormous unpaid debts from Recommended Distribution, Cutler was forced to restart his own distribution system again, and RēR became RēR/Recommended. Recommended Distribution went on to become These Records, an affiliated label. RēR/Recommended became known as RēR Megacorp with a website and online shopping facilities.

RēR logos
Just as Recommended Records's name evolved over the years, so did its logo. Here are examples from 1979 and 1998:

Imprints
Recommended Records has the following imprints:
 Points East – established to release experimental music from Central Europe
 Freedonia – established to release records by Půlnoc, formerly The Plastic People of the Universe
 Political Underground – established to release records by Unrest Work and Play
 Fred Records – dedicated to re-releasing the back catalogue of Fred Frith recordings plus previously unreleased material
 This is! – set up by Charles Hayward and Charles Bullen to re-release This Heat's back catalogue

Affiliated labels
A distribution network of affiliated labels exists throughout the world to promote experimental, unusual and innovative music. While many of these labels are distinct operations, they share a common musical ethic. Some of these affiliated labels are:
 Ad Hoc Records – RēR USA label
 Locus Solus – Recommended Records Japan
 These Records – independent UK label and mail-order shop
 RecRec Music – RēR Switzerland, an independent Swiss label (no longer active)
 Review Records – ReRe Germany, an independent German label
 No Man's Land – an imprint of Review (ReRe) Records
 AYAA – Recommended France, an independent French label (no longer active)
 Cuneiform Records – US distributor of RēR, an independent US label

Artists
These are some of the artists that have had music released or re-released on the Recommended Records label.

5uu's
After Dinner
AMM
Paolo Angeli
Arcane Device
Art Bears
Biota/Mnemonists
Peter Blegvad
Brainville 3
Cassiber
Lindsay Cooper
Chris Cutler
Peter Cusack
Tod Dockstader
Bob Drake
Faust
Janet Feder
Fred Frith
Lutz Glandien
Light Coorporation
Ground Zero
Haco
Hail
Alfred Harth
Henry Cow
Tim Hodgkinson
The Homosexuals
Robert Iolini
Kalahari Surfers
Keep the Dog
Boris Kovač
Les 4 Guitaristes de l'Apocalypso-Bar
Albert Marcoeur
Elio Martusciello
Massacre
R. Stevie Moore
The Necks
News from Babel
John Oswald
P53
Zeena Parkins
Lesego Rampolokeng
Jon Rose
The Science Group
Skeleton Crew
Slapp Happy
Sun Ra
Richard Aaker Trythall
Thinking Plague
This Heat
Jack Vees
Charles Vrtacek
When

RēR compilations
Various artists: Recommended Records Sampler (1982, 2xLP, Recommended Records)
Various artists: Recommended Records Sampler (1982, EP, Recommended Records)
Various artists: RēR Quarterly (1985–1997, LP/CD + magazine, Recommended Records)

See also
 List of independent UK record labels

References

External links
Chris Cutler homepage.
RēR Megacorp. Recommended Records UK.
Recommended Records at SquidCo.

British independent record labels
Record labels established in 1978
Alternative rock record labels
Experimental music record labels
Chris Cutler
1978 establishments in the United Kingdom